APS or Aps or aps or similar may refer to:

Education
 Abbottabad Public School
 Adarsh Public School, a public school in New Delhi, India
 Alamogordo Public Schools
 Albuquerque Public Schools, New Mexico, US school district
 Allendale Public Schools
 Indian Army Public Schools
 Associated Public Schools of Victoria, independent school group, Australia
 Atlanta Public Schools
 Abbotsford Public School, in Abbotsford, New South Wales

Medicine and physiology
 Adenosine 5'-phosphosulfate, metabolic precursor to 3'-phosphoadenosine-5'-phosphosulfate (PAPS)
 Antiphospholipid syndrome
 Autoimmune polyendocrine syndrome

Organizations, media and firms
ASTRA Platform Services
Aborigines' Protection Society
Adult Protective Services
Algeria Press Service, news agency based in Algiers, Algeria
Alternative Press Syndicate, formerly Underground Press Syndicate
American Philatelic Society, or their postage stamp authentication service
American Philosophical Society
 American Physical Society
 American Physiological Society
 American Phytopathological Society
Arizona Public Service, an electric power company
Armenian Professional Society
 Association for Psychological Science
 Association for Psychosocial Studies
Australian Federal Police Protective Service, formerly Australian Protective Service
 Australasian Proteomics Society
 Australian Psychological Society
Australian Public Service

Places
 Anápolis, Goiás, Brazil, IATA airport code
 Apsley railway station, Apsley, England, National Rail code
 Alba-la-Romaine, Ardèche, France, known as Aps until 1904

Science
 Advanced Photon Source, a synchrotron X-ray source at Argonne National Laboratory
 Algebra of physical space
 Ammonium persulfate, oxidizing agent commonly used in polyacrylamide gels
 Apus (constellation), IAU abbreviation

Technology
 Application Packaging Standard
 Active pixel sensor
 Advanced Photo System, photography
 APS-C and APS-H, digital camera sensor formats
 Asynchronous Protocol Specification, or X.445, a telecommunications standard
 Atmospheric Plasma Spray, a thermal spraying technique
 Application Support sublayer of the Zigbee specification

Transport
 Accessible Pedestrian Signal
 Alimentation par Sol, electrical ground-level power supply for trams by Alstom
 Auxiliary Propulsion System, a component of the Saturn V S-IVB upper stage

Weaponry
 APS Stechkin, Soviet machine pistol
 APS underwater rifle
 Active protection system, for vehicles against missile attacks

Other
 Advanced planning and scheduling
 Annual Population Survey, a household survey in Great Britain
 Anpartsselskab, the Danish abbreviation (ApS) for a limited liability company
 Africa Partnership Station, a United States Navy maritime safety initiative
 Average propensity to save, proportion of income which is saved

See also

 
 
 
 
 
 Apse (disambiguation)
 AP (disambiguation)